The Ricoh GXR is a compact digital camera first announced by Ricoh Company, Ltd, Tokyo on November 10, 2009. Unlike conventional cameras which either have a fixed lens and sensor or interchangeable lens and a fixed sensor, the GXR takes interchangeable units, each housing a lens, sensor and image processing engine. This allows each unit to have these features optimised to one another and a specific task, whereas with conventional interchangeable lens cameras, each different lens must use the same sensor and engine. The sealed units also prevent dust from reaching the sensor, which can be a problem with other cameras where the sensor is exposed whilst a lens is being changed. A significant disadvantage of this system is the extra cost involved in having to buy a whole new sensor with every new lens.

The body holds a built-in pop-up flash as well as a hot shoe on top for an external flash unit. Alternatively, Ricoh's 'VF-2', an external electronic viewfinder, can be attached to the hot shoe which, offers 920,000 pixels and 100% field of view. The separate units slide onto the body via a stainless steel rail and lock into place. They can then be released by a lever on the camera's body. Both the body and lens unit use magnesium alloy exterior. Each lens unit has its own unique specifications relating to its sensor and optics, meaning that different lens units will change the features, behavior and performance of the camera body to varying degrees when attached.

Units

Camera units
RICOH LENS P10 28-300mm F3.5-5.6 VC 
 10.6 megapixel, 1/2.3" CMOS sensor
 28–300 mm (expressed as 35 mm equivalent) 3.5-5.6 VC lens 
 GR engine "Smooth Imaging Engine IV" 
 Manual and auto focus
 Movie mode up to 1280 x 720 at 30 frames per second
 GR LENS A12 50mm F2.5 MACRO
 12.30 megapixel, APS-C sized  (23.6×15.7 mm) CMOS sensor
 50 mm (expressed as 35 mm equivalent)  GR lens 
 GR engine III
 Manual and auto focus
 RICOH LENS S10 24-72mm F2.5-4.4 VC
 10 megapixel, 1/1.7" CCD Sensor
 24–72 mm (expressed as 35 mm equivalent) , 3× Ricoh zoom lens
 Smooth Imaging engine IV
GR LENS A12 28mm F2.5
 12.30 megapixel, APS-C sized  (23.6×15.7 mm) CMOS sensor
 28 mm (expressed as 35 mm equivalent)  GR lens
 GR engine III
 Manual and auto focus
GR LENS A16 24-85mm F3.5-5.5 
 11 elements in 9 groups (3 aspherical lens elements with 6 surfaces)
 55mm filter thread
 16.20 megapixel, APS-C sized  (23.6×15.7 mm) CMOS sensor
 Smooth Imaging engine IV
 Manual and auto focus

Lens mount units
GR MOUNT A12
 Leica M mount
 12.30 megapixel, APS-C sized  (23.6×15.7 mm) CMOS sensor

See also 
 Minolta Dimage EX
 Other Modular Cameras

References

External links 
 
 
  (samples photos)
  (review - full size samples)

Ricoh digital cameras
Mirrorless interchangeable lens cameras